Genicanthus caudovittatus, the zebra angelfish, swallowtail angelfish, and lyretail angelfish, is a species of marine ray-finned fish, a marine angelfish belonging to  the family Pomacanthidae. It is found in the Indian Ocean.

Description

Genicanthus caudovittatus shows sexual dichromatism, the males and females have differing colouration. The males are whitish-blue marked with vertical dark brown barring and a black band running along the middle of the dorsal fin base. The females are pale pinkish grey with a black band over the eye and a black band on the upper and lower margins of the caudal fin. Both sexes have a markedly forked caudal fin. The dorsal fin contains 15 spines and 15–17 soft rays while the anal fin has 3 spines and 17–19 soft rays.

Distribution
Genicanthus caudovittatus is distributed in western Indian Ocean where it occurs along the eastern coast of Africa from the Red Sea in the north to KwaZulu-Natal in  South Africa, east to Madagascar, Maldives, Mauritius, and Réunion. It has also been recorded from Weh Island off northwestern Sumatra.

Habitat and biology
In the Red Sea it can be found in shallower water than in the Andaman Sea. It can be found on steep outer reef slopes where it lives in small groups made up of a male and a few females. It feeds on plankton. Juveniles live at greater depth than the adults.

Systematics 
Genicanthus caudovittatus was first formally described in 1860 as Holocanthus caudovittatus by the German-born British ichthyologist and herpetologist Albert Günther (1830–1914) with the type locality given as Mauritius. The specific name is a compound of caudus meaning “tail” and vittatus meaning “banded”, referring to the black markings on the tail.

Utilisation
Genicanthus caudovittatus occasionally appears in the aquarium trade.

References

External links
 

caudovittatus
Fish of the Red Sea
Fish of Sri Lanka
Marine fauna of East Africa
Fauna of the Maldives
Fauna of Seychelles
Fauna of the Mascarene Islands
Fish described in 1860
Taxa named by Albert Günther